The 1934–35 İstanbul Football League season was the 27th season of the league. Fenerbahçe SK won the league for the 7th time.

Season

References

Istanbul Football League seasons
Turkey
Istanbul